Children's Miracle Network Hospitals (CMN Hospitals) (French: Réseau Enfants-Santé (RES)) is a nonprofit organization that raises funds for children's hospitals in the U.S. and Canada. Donations support the health of 10 million children each year.

Donations, which go to local hospitals, fund critical life-saving treatments and healthcare services along with innovative research, pediatric medical equipment, kids' emotional health support during difficult hospital stays, and financial assistance for families who could not otherwise afford these health services. CMN Hospitals funds are unrestricted. Donations stay local and are directed to local member hospitals that understands in a better way of  pertaining to their community needs, Funds are used where they are needed the most.

The organization, founded in 1983 by Marie Osmond, John Schneider, Mick Shannon, and Joe Lake, is headquartered in Salt Lake City, Utah. The current president and CEO is Teri Nestel. Till date, CMN Hospitals has raised more than US$7 billion, which is distributed directly to a network of 158 hospitals.

History
Children's Miracle Network began as a telethon in 1983. Shannon and Lake conceived the telethon with Schneider and Osmond serving as hosts. The first telethon raised $4.8 million for 22 hospitals. The telethon continued as a major fundraising arm for the organization for many years, and some hospital markets still use it today.

Children's Miracle Network rebranded as Children's Miracle Network Hospitals in the U.S. in 2011. Today, CMN Hospitals is the largest network of children's hospitals in the U.S. and Canada. The organization's member hospitals provide 32 million treatments each year to children across North America. Most of the $7 billion raised by the organization has come $1 at a time through the charity's Miracle Balloon icon.

Fundraising
Children's Miracle Network Hospitals raises money each year to support local children's hospitals. CMN Hospitals' fundraising efforts include corporate fundraising campaigns with more than 80 corporate partners and fundraising programs including Dance Marathon, the global Extra Life gaming platform, and Radiothon, which hosts radio fundraisers through radio stations in support of their CMN Hospital. The funds raised by CMN Hospitals stay in local communities and with local CMN Hospitals.

Corporate fundraising partners include Walmart, Ace Hardware, Sam's Club, Costco Wholesale, Wawa, RE/MAX, IHOP, Credit Unions For Kids, Love's Travel Stops, Costco, CDW, Delta Air Lines, Publix, Rite Aid, Dairy Queen, IHOP, Sigma Chi, Delta Zeta, Domino Sugar, Phi Mu, Speedway LLC, Phi Delta Epsilon, Phi Kappa Theta, Zeta Beta Tau, Sigma Alpha Epsilon, and Marriott International. In 2019, Walmart celebrated $1 billion raised for CMN Hospitals through its partnership with the organization.

Many universities host annual Dance Marathon events to support Children's Miracle Network Hospitals and other local children's hospitals. These events have collectively raised more than $250 million to support CMN Hospitals services, such as the Indiana University Dance Marathon which raised more than $36 million for Riley Hospital for Children in Indianapolis, Indiana.

Extra Life is another Children's Miracle Network Hospitals program that unites tens of thousands of gamers globally to play games and raise funds year-round to support kids treated at their local CMN Hospital. Since its inception in 2008, Extra Life has raised more than $100 million. 

In 2021, Ferrero Candy partnered with CMN and launched a campaign. “Three iconic Ferrero candy bars, Butterfinger, CRUNCH and Baby Ruth, are joining forces to help the Children’s Miracle Network Hospitals.” Limited edition packaging designed by CMN Child ambassadors will be sold.

Celebrity support
Children's Miracle Network Hospitals celebrity supporters are individuals who, over the organization's history have visited children's hospitals, filmed commercials, made donations, or participated in other initiatives to encourage donations to local children's hospitals. Children's Miracle Network Hospitals celebrity supporters include:  
Backstreet Boys
Kristen Bell
Nick Cannon
Dinger City
Adam Devine
Chris Evans
Paris Hilton
Jonas Brothers
Lady Antebellum
Jack Nicklaus
Julianne Hough
Ke$ha or Kesha
Katy Perry
Chris Pine
Blake Shelton
Steve Young
Zendaya

Awards and accolades
The organization has received multiple Gold & Silver Halo awards from the Cause Marketing Forum for its marketing campaigns with organizations including IHOP and Aflac. The organization won The Golden Halo in 2014. CMN Hospitals won a Shorty Award in 2019 in Best Facebook Live for their #ChildrensHospitalsWeek Live-athon. Utah Business Magazine also named CMN Hospitals one of Utah's Best Companies to Work For in 2015.

References

Children's charities based in the United States
Health charities in the United States
Organizations established in 1983
American telethons
Charities based in Utah
1983 establishments in Utah
Medical and health organizations based in Utah